Roger Karl-Göran Richthoff (born 11 December 1948) is a Swedish politician and former soldier who was a member of the Riksdag from 2014 to 2022.

Richthoff served in the Swedish Engineer Troops and was a United Nations peacekeeping officer from 1973 to 1991. He was elected to parliament during the 2014 Swedish general election. In parliament, Richthoff has sat on the defense committee and been part of the Delegation of the Riksdag to NATO. He has served as the defense spokesman for the Sweden Democrats (SD). In 2014, Richthoff spoke out against plans to build a refugee camp in Strängnäs.

Richthoff has been noted for controversy on social media. In 2021, he called COVID-19 vaccines for children a "poison injection". He also shared a video wherein Russia is thanked for the 2022 Russian invasion of Ukraine on Twitter. In the video, an antisemitic conspiracy theory is presented, stating that Barack Obama and George Soros is using Ukrainian laboratories to commit genocide against Christians. In response to the latter incident, the SD's leader in Parliament Henrik Vinge denounced Richthoff's actions as "irresponsible" and on 30 March 2022 he left Riksdag Defense Committee and had the party whip withdrawn. He remained an independent MP until the next election, which he was barred by the SD from standing as a candidate for the party. Later in the same year he joined the far-right SD-splinter Alternative for Sweden, stating that he agreed with their party programme on several points.

References 

Living people
1948 births
Alternative for Sweden politicians
Members of the Riksdag 2014–2018
Members of the Riksdag 2018–2022
Members of the Riksdag from the Sweden Democrats
People from Strängnäs Municipality